The England Under-19 cricket team have been playing official Under-19 Test matches since 1974. Prior to 1991/92 they were known as England Young Cricketers.

Former captains include Mike Atherton, Michael Vaughan, Alastair Cook and Andrew Flintoff, who have all gone on to captain the senior national team in Test matches.

Recent call-ups
This lists all the players who have been selected for England under-19s since the start of the 2021 season and their most recent call-up. In that period squads have been named for:
An ODI series at home to West Indies in September 2021, in which they played six matches.
An ODI series away to Sri Lanka in November and December 2021, in which they played five matches.
The 2022 ICC Under-19 Cricket World Cup in the West Indies in January and February 2022.
A series at home to Sri Lanka in August and September 2022, comprising two Tests and three ODIs.

The team's coach is Richard Dawson, who has been in position since March 2021.

 = withdrew injured

Performances at Under-19 World Cups

References

External links
England Development Programme at ecb.co.uk

Under-19 cricket teams
C
C
England in international cricket
Wales in international cricket